Deosai National Park is a high-altitude alpine plain (plateau) and National Park located between Skardu District and Astore District in Gilgit-Baltistan.

Deosai Plains are situated at an average elevation of 4,114 metres (13,497 ft) above sea level and considered as the second highest plateaus in the world.

Etymology

Deosai is a Shina language word ,The name came about from the folk tale immortalised by Mian Muhammad Baksh in his poem, "Saif al-Mulook"; the word 'Deosai' means 'the Shadow of the Giant': the word "Deo" being a contraction of 'Deva', and the word 'Sai' being one of 'Saya' i.e. 'Shadow'.Sai or Sain also an acronym for swami or lord.

Balti people call this place 'Ghbiarsa' referring to 'Summer's Place' because it is only accessible in summer.

Geography

The Deosai National Park is located in western Himalayas in Gilgit Baltistan (GB), Pakistan. It is well known for its rich flora and fauna of the Karakoram-West Tibetan Plateau alpine steppe eco-region. In spring, it is covered by sweeps of wildflowers and a wide variety of butterflies.

Geology and soil
The soils of this area are severely eroded, of a coarser nature and mixed with gravel and stones of various materials and sizes. In flat areas between mountains, soil is deep with marshy vegetation.

Fauna and Flora 

The Deosai National Park was established in 1993 to protect the survival of the Himalayan brown bear and its habitat. Having long been a prize kill for poachers and hunters, the bear now has a hope for survival in Deosai where its number has increased from only 19 in 1993 to 40 in 2005. In 1993, after playing an instrumental role in the designation of Deosai as a National Park, the Himalayan Wildlife Foundation (formerly the Himalayan Wildlife Project) was founded with a substantial international financial support. The Himalayan Wildlife Foundation ran two park entry check posts and a field research camp in Deosai for approximately ten years. Documentation was completed by the Himalayan Wildlife Foundation for the handover of the management of the Park to the, then, Northern Areas Forest Department with the department starting to manage the park since 2006. While pressures that existed in the 1990s, such as hunting and poaching have subsided, the brown bear is still under threat due to pressures such as increasing numbers of tourists and the use of park areas for grazing.

The Deosai Plains are also home to the Siberian ibex, Snow Leopard, Kashmir Musk Deer, Himalayan wolf, Himalayan marmot and over 124 types of resident and migratory birds. Birds in the park include the Golden eagle, Lammergeier, Himalayan vulture, Laggar falcon, Peregrine falcon, Eurasian kestrel, Eurasian sparrowhawk, and Himalayan snowcock.

The following plant species are found in Deosai:

Polygonum affine, Thalictrum alpinum, Bromus oxyodon, Saxifraga flagellaris, Androsace mucronifolia, Aster flaccidus, Barbarea vulgaris, Artemisia maritima, Elymus longiaristatus, Nepeta connata, Carex cruenta, Ranunculus laetus, Arenaria neelgherrensis, Astragalus leucocephalus, Polygonum amplexinade, Echinops niveus, Senecio chrysanthemoides, Artemisia spp., Dracocephalum nutans, Taxus contorta, Chrysopogon gryllus subsp. echinulatus and Dianthus crinitus. There were also observed some medicinal plants which are locally famous i.e. Thymus linearis (Reetumburuk), Saussurea lappa (kuth), Ephedra gerardiana (Say), Viola pilosa (Skora-mindoq), Pleurospermum candollei (Shamdun) and Artemisia brevifolia (Bursay) etc. which are used as traditional drug therapies.

Cultural references

Herodotus
Research by the French ethnologist Michel Peissel makes a claim that the story of 'Gold-digging ants' reported by the Greek historian Herodotus, who lived in the 5th century BC, was founded on the golden Himalayan Marmot of the Deosai plateau and the habit of local tribes such as Minaro to collect the gold dust excavated from their burrows.

In film
 The documentary film series Land of the Tiger in episode 5 - the "Mountains of the Gods" features the plants and animals of Deosai.
 Karakoram Heliski 2013 by Walkabout Films
 Documentary movie "DEOSAI - The Last Sanctuary" by Walkabout Films

Travel routes to the region
Deosai is accessible from Astore District in the west, Skardu District in the north, and Galtari in Kharmang District in the south-east. It is also accessible from Mehdiabad via Mehdiabad-Dapa Road. Deosai is located approximately 30 km from Skardu city, which is the shortest route to visit Deosai. Another route is from Astore valley via Chilim. It is also accessible from Shila valley. The people of Galtari travel via Deosai. While it is a National Park, the Gujjar-Bakwarwal travel large distances to utilize the Deosai National Park as grazing lands. There is another route called Burgi la via Tsoq Kachura valley Skardu.

See also

 Karakoram
 Gilgit
 Baltistan

References

External links 
 Official website of Government of Gilgit Baltistan about Deosai National Park
 National Parks of Gilgit-Baltistan

Skardu District
Protected areas of Gilgit-Baltistan
National parks of India